MacroModel is a computer program for molecular modelling of organic compounds and biopolymers.  It features various chemistry force fields, plus energy minimizing algorithms, to predict geometry and relative conformational energies of molecules. MacroModel is maintained by Schrödinger, LLC.

It performs simulations in the framework of classical mechanics, also termed molecular mechanics, and can perform molecular dynamics simulations to model systems at finite temperatures using stochastic dynamics and mixed Monte Carlo algorithms. MacroModel supports Windows, Linux, macOS, Silicon Graphics (SGI) IRIX, and IBM AIX.

The Macromodel software package was first been described in the scientific literature in 1990, and has been subsequently acquired by Schrödinger, Inc. in 2000.

Key features

Known version history 
2013: version 10.0
2012: version 9.9.2
2011: version 9.9.1
2010: version 9.8
2009: version 9.7
2008: version 9.6
2007: version 9.5
2006: version 9.1
2005: version 9.0
2004: version 8.5
2003: version 8.1

See also

References

External links
 

Molecular modelling software
Molecular dynamics software